is a former Japanese football player.

Playing career
Kanda was born in Chuo, Yamanashi on September 29, 1977. After graduating from Tokyo Gakugei University, he joined the J2 League club Ventforet Kofu based in his area in 2000. He played often as midfielder during his first season. In 2001, he moved to the Prefectural Leagues club Gunma FC Horikoshi (later FC Horikoshi). He played as a regular player and the club was promoted to the Regional Leagues in 2002 and the Japan Football League in 2004. In September 2005, he moved to the Regional Leagues club Matsumoto Yamaga FC. He retired at the end of the 2005 season.

Club statistics

References

External links

1977 births
Living people
Tokyo Gakugei University alumni
Association football people from Yamanashi Prefecture
Japanese footballers
J2 League players
Japan Football League players
Ventforet Kofu players
Arte Takasaki players
Matsumoto Yamaga FC players
Association football midfielders